Jeremy Smith (born April 13, 1989), also known as Jieruimi Shimisi, is an American-born Chinese professional ice hockey goaltender. Born in the United States, he is currently playing with HC Kunlun Red Star of the Kontinental Hockey League (KHL) and represented China at the 2022 Winter Olympics. Smith was selected in the second round, 54th overall, by the Nashville Predators in the 2007 NHL Entry Draft.

Playing career
Since turning professional in the 2009–10 season, Smith, while within the Predators organization, was shuffled between the Milwaukee Admirals of the AHL and the Cincinnati Cyclones of the ECHL.

On July 5, 2013, Smith signed a one-year contract as a free agent with the Columbus Blue Jackets. After attending the Blue Jackets training camp he was assigned to AHL affiliate, the Springfield Falcons''.

On July 2, 2014, Smith signed a one-year, two-way contract with the Boston Bruins. Smith was sent down to Providence Bruins to be a call up along with Malcolm Subban for the majority of the season.

On July 1, 2015, the Boston Bruins re-signed Smith to a one-year, two-way contract. With Smith unable to earn the backup role and with the Bruins suffering a surplus of goaltenders in their system, he was assigned on loan to AHL affiliate club of the Minnesota Wild, the Iowa Wild, for the duration of the 2015–16 season on October 6, 2015. On February 6, 2016, Providence's Malcolm Subban was hospitalized after taking a puck to the throat. With Subban ruled out for eight weeks due to this injury, Smith was recalled from his loan with the Iowa Wild to provide Providence with cover. In Subban's absence, Smith was a standout for Providence, posting 13 wins in 20 games and earning his first recall to the NHL, on an emergency basis, on April 9, 2016. He was returned to the AHL for the post-season without featuring for the Bruins.

At the conclusion of the season, Smith left the Bruins organization as a free agent. On July 1, 2016, he signed a one-year, two-way contract to join the Colorado Avalanche. Smith began the 2016–17 season in the AHL with affiliate, the San Antonio Rampage. He was injured in his third game with the Rampage and missed two months of action before returning to post his first win with the Rampage in a 4–2 victory over the Tucson Roadrunners on December 17, 2016. On December 27, Smith was recalled by the Avalanche after injury to starting goaltender Semyon Varlamov and backed up Calvin Pickard for five games before he was returned to the Rampage on January 5, 2017. With Varlamov suffering a season-ending injury, Smith was recalled on a second occasion on February 9, 2017. He made his NHL debut with the Avalanche, making 37 saves in a 3–2 defeat to the New Jersey Devils on February 14, 2017. In his third start with the Avalanche he received his first NHL win, making 34 saves in the team's 5–3 win over the Buffalo Sabres on February 25, 2017.

As a free agent in the off-season, Smith left the Avalanche to sign a one-year, two-way contract with the Carolina Hurricanes on July 1, 2017. For the following 2017–18 season, Smith was unable to add to his NHL experience, assigned to the AHL affiliate Charlotte Checkers for the duration of the campaign. In 30 games, Smith collected 13 wins and posted a goals against average of 2.71.

At the completion of his contract with the Hurricanes, Smith became a free agent and agreed to sign a one-year AHL contract with the Bridgeport Sound Tigers on July 9, 2018. In the following 2018–19 season, Smith had collected 16 wins through 32 games for the Sound Tigers before he was signed to a two-way contract by the New York Islanders for the remainder of the year on February 24, 2019. In adding depth to the goaltending ranks of the playoff-bound Islanders, Smith would continue to play with their AHL affiliate.

On June 10, 2019, Smith as an impending free agent, signed his first contract abroad, agreeing to a two-year contract with Chinese outfit Kunlun Red Star of the KHL.

International play
Due to his stint in China, Smith was called up to represent the China men's national ice hockey team for the 2022 Winter Olympics. According to some sources, he became a Chinese citizen in order to be eligible to represent the nation at the Olympics. Smith's teammate Jake Chelios confirmed that he kept his American citizenship but denied answering whether he naturalized as a Chinese citizen. While the Olympic Charter stipulates that any athlete competing in the Games must be a national of the country of the NOC which is entering such competitor, the IOC Executive Board has the authority to make certain exceptions of a "general or individual nature", though it is unclear whether this was the case.

During the games, the pinyin version of the Chinese transcription of Smith's name, Jieruimi Shimisi, was used for commentary and statistics records by the IOC.

Career statistics

Regular season and playoffs

International

Awards and honors

References

External links
 

1989 births
Living people
Chinese ice hockey goaltenders
Olympic ice hockey players of China
American men's ice hockey goaltenders
American emigrants to China
Naturalized citizens of the People's Republic of China
Bridgeport Sound Tigers players
Charlotte Checkers (2010–) players
Cincinnati Cyclones (ECHL) players
Colorado Avalanche players
Ice hockey players from Michigan
Iowa Wild players
HC Kunlun Red Star players
Milwaukee Admirals players
Nashville Predators draft picks
Niagara IceDogs players
Sportspeople from Dearborn, Michigan
Plymouth Whalers players
Providence Bruins players
San Antonio Rampage players
Springfield Falcons players
Ice hockey players at the 2022 Winter Olympics